Larochea secunda is an extremely minute species of sea snail, a marine gastropod mollusc or micromollusc in the family Larocheidae.

Description

Distribution
This marine species occurs off New Zealand.

References
 A.W.B. Powell,  New species of marine mollusca from New Zealand, Discovery Report, National Institute of Oceanography of Great Britain, v. 15, 1937, p. 207-208
 Powell A. W. B., New Zealand Mollusca, William Collins Publishers Ltd, Auckland, New Zealand 1979 
 Marshall, B. A., 1993. The systematic position of Larochea Finlay, 1927, and introduction of a new genus and two new species (Gastropoda: Scissurellidae).  J. Moll. Studies, 59(3):285-294.
 Geiger D.L. (2012) Monograph of the little slit shells. Volume 1. Introduction, Scissurellidae. pp. 1-728. Volume 2. Anatomidae, Larocheidae, Depressizonidae, Sutilizonidae, Temnocinclidae. pp. 729–1291. Santa Barbara Museum of Natural History Monographs Number 7

Larocheidae
Gastropods of New Zealand
Gastropods described in 1937